JWH-307 is an analgesic  drug used in scientific research, which acts as a cannabinoid agonist at both the CB1 and CB2 receptors. It is somewhat selective for the CB2 subtype, with a Ki of 7.7 nM at CB1 vs 3.3 nM at CB2. It was discovered by, and named after, John W. Huffman. JWH-307 was detected as an ingredient in synthetic cannabis smoking blends in 2012, initially in Germany.

In the United States, CB1 receptor agonists of the 3-(1-naphthoyl)pyrrole class such as JWH-307 are Schedule I Controlled Substances.

See also 
 JWH-147

References 

Naphthoylpyrroles
JWH cannabinoids
Fluoroarenes
CB1 receptor agonists
CB2 receptor agonists